Cedar Creek is a stream in Ralls County in the U.S. state of Missouri. It is a tributary of the Salt River.

Cedar Creek was so named on account of cedar trees near its course.

See also
List of rivers of Missouri

References

Rivers of Ralls County, Missouri
Rivers of Missouri